Papyrus 61 (in the Gregory-Aland numbering), signed by 𝔓61, is a copy of the New Testament in Greek. It is a papyrus manuscript of the Pauline epistles. The manuscript paleographically has been assigned to the 8th century.

 Contents
Ro 16:23-27; 1 Cor 1:1-2.4-6; 5:1-3.5-6.9-13; Philip 3:5-9.12-16; 1 Thess 1:2-3; Tit 3:1-5.8-11.14-15; Philem. 4-7;

 Text
The Greek text of this codex is a representative of the Alexandrian text-type. Aland placed it in Category II.

 Location
It is currently housed at The Morgan Library & Museum (P. Colt 5) in New York City.

See also 

 List of New Testament papyri
 Related Bible parts: Romans 16; 1 Corinthians 1; 1 Corinthians 5; Philippians 3; 1 Thessalonians 1; Titus 3; Philemon

References

Further reading 

 L. Casson, and E. L. Hettich, Excavations at Nessana II, Literary Papyri (Princeton: 1946), pp. 112–122.
 G. Cavallo, Pap. Flor. 36 (2005), p. 197

External links 
 LDAB

New Testament papyri
7th-century biblical manuscripts
Collection of the Morgan Library & Museum
Epistle to the Romans papyri
First Epistle to the Corinthians papyri
Epistle to the Philippians papyri
First Epistle to the Thessalonians papyri
Epistle to Titus papyri
Epistle to Philemon papyri